The Sasoli is a Baloch tribe in Balochistan province of Pakistan.

Ancestors of Sasoli: Sardar Yusuf Khan Sasoli, Sardar Allah Gul Khan Sasoli, Sardar Qayyum Khan Sasoli These Sardars are called historical and great Sardars of Sasoli tribe.  After the death of Sardar Yusuf Khan Sasoli, his son Sardar Nasrullah Khan Sasoli became Sardar, after the death of Sardar Allah Gul Khan Sasoli, his son Sardar Muhammad Gul Khan Sasoli became Sardar, and after the death of Sardar Qayyum Khan Sasoli, his son  Sardar Changez Khan Sasoli became Sardar. And this is the current Sardars of the Sasoli nation. According to tribal tradition, the Sasoli migrated from Aleppo, in modern Syria, along with other Baloch tribes. According to ethnologists and linguists, however, the Baloch, including Sasoli, originated from the Caspian Region, potentially from Balasagan.

The tribe has many branches including Allah Dadzi, Lashkarzai, Zarrenzi, Baloli and Alam Khanzi. It is the second largest Balochi tribe by population.

Many Sasoli are bilingual, speaking the Balochi and Brahui languages. 

Sasoli people can also be found in the Karachi Sindh, Punjab and Khyber Pakhtunkhwa provinces of Pakistan. The Sasoli also have heredity lands in Iran, Afghanistan, Oman, UAE, Saudi Arabia, and India.

References

Baloch tribes
Social groups of Pakistan